The Hurghada International is a squash tournament held in Hurghada, Egypt in May. It is part of the PSA World Tour and the WSA World Tour.

Past results

Men's

Women's

References

External links
- 2011 Hurghada International Squashsite page
- PSA Hurghada International 2011
- WSA Hurghada International 2011

Squash tournaments in Egypt
Squash in Egypt
Recurring sporting events established in 2011